Lia Dorana (18 July 1918 – 4 December 2010) was a Dutch comedian and actress. Dorana was born Beppy van Werven in The Hague on 18 July 1918. She was discovered by Dutch singer and cabaret singer Wim Sonneveld, with whom she launched her early career. She also worked with Hetty Blok and Conny Stuart.

Lia Dorana died in her hometown of Lage Vuursche, in the Dutch province of Utrecht, on 4 December 2010, at the age of 92.

References

External links

1918 births
2010 deaths
Dutch women comedians
Dutch cabaret performers
Dutch musical theatre actresses
Dutch stage actresses
Dutch television actresses
People from Baarn
Actresses from The Hague